Tason is a village on the Chindwin River in Homalin Township, Hkamti District, in the Sagaing Region of northwestern Burma. It is located north of Maungkan. Gardens were planted in Tason around 1700 and the village has been documented as producing pickled tea, known as "letpet".

References

External links
Maplandia World Gazetteer

Populated places in Hkamti District
Homalin Township